The Brazilian Championship of Rugby, or Super 16, is the main tournament for rugby union clubs in Brazil since 1964. The tournament is organized by the Brazilian Rugby Confederation (CBRu).

By number of titles
SPAC – 13 titles (1964, 1965, 1966, 1967, 1968, 1969, 1974, 1975, 1976*, 1977, 1978, 1999, 2013)
São José – 9 titles (2002, 2003, 2004, 2007, 2008, 2010, 2011, 2012, 2015)
Alphaville – 7 titles (1980, 1982, 1983**, 1985, 1989, 1991, 1992)
Niterói – 6 titles (1976*, 1979, 1983**, 1984, 1986, 1990)
Bandeirantes– 4 titles (1988, 1995, 2001, 2009)
Rio Branco – 4 titles (1993, 1997, 1998, 2006)
Desterro – 3 titles (1996, 2000, 2005)
Medicina Rugby – 2 titles (1973, 1981)
Pasteur – 2 titles (1987, 1994)
São Paulo Barbarians R.F.C. – 2 titles (1970, 1971)
Curitiba – 2 titles (2014, 2016)
Poli – 1 title (2018)
Jacareí – 1 title (2017)
FUPE – 1 title (1972)

* In 1976 the title was shared between SPAC and Niterói ** In 1983 the title was shared between by Alphaville and Niterói

Competition format
In the 2006, the competition consisted of eight clubs, in two groups of four teams. The clubs from one group played once against the four clubs in the other group, with the two best placed teams in each group qualifying for the semi-finals. The semi-finals and the final were one-legged matches. Since 2009, the competition consisted of one division with each team playing the others once.

Results

Former teams 
Listed alphabetically
Alphaville Tênis Clube - SP - Barueri
Araucária Clube de Rugby - PR - Curitiba (extinct)
Armstrong Dragons - Potiguar Rugby Club - RN - Natal
Bandeirantes Rugby Club - SP - São Paulo
Belo Horizonte Rugby - MG - Belo Horizonte
Curitiba Rugby Clube - PR - Curitiba 
Desterro Rugby Clube - SC - Florianópolis
Farrapos Rugby Clube - RS - Bento Gonçalves
FEI Rugby (FEI) - SP - São Bernardo do Campo
FUPE (Paulista Federation of University Sports) - SP
Guanabara Rugby Football Clube - RJ - Rio de Janeiro
Niterói Rugby Football Clube - RJ - Niterói
Medicina Rugby (FMUSP) - SP - São Paulo
O'malley's Rugby Football Club - SP - São Paulo
Orixás - BA (bahiana selection of rugby) 
Pasteur Athletique Club - SP - São Paulo (former team of the College Liceu Pasteur) 
Rio Branco Rugby Clube - SP - São Paulo
Rio de Janeiro Rugby Football Clube - RJ - Rio de Janeiro
RJ Union - RJ (extinct) 
São José Rugby Clube - SP - São José dos Campos
São Paulo Athletic Club - SP - São Paulo
São Paulo Barbarians R.F.C. - SP - São Paulo (extinct) 
Varginha Rugby - MG - Varginha

Broadcasting
Since 2011, the semi-final and final has been broadcast by SporTV, the most watched sports channel in Brazil.

See also
 Rugby union in Brazil

External links
 Rugby Super 10 website

Rugby union leagues in Brazil
Sports leagues in Brazil
Professional sports leagues in Brazil